Gun Ay Tabriz Team is an Iranian UCI Continental cycling team established in 2018.

Team roster

References

UCI Continental Teams (Asia)
Cycling teams established in 2018
Cycling teams based in Iran